Cathedral of the Sea is a 2006 historical novel by Spanish author Ildefonso Falcones. The action takes place in 14th century Barcelona at the height of the city's  trade and military power in the Mediterranean, during the construction of Santa Maria del Mar serving as background to the story.

In 2018, a high-budget drama series adaptation by Atresmedia was broadcast in Antena 3 from 23 May 2018 to 18 July 2018. Netflix released the series worldwide in 1 September 2018.

Plot summary

The book is set in Barcelona and its main character is Arnau Estanyol, the son of a fugitive serf and one of the cathedral's stone workers, who obtains freedom and eventually achieves a high status in society.

Awards 
The novel has won several literary awards including:
  2006 (Spain)
 The  Award (Spain)
  Award 2007 (Italy)

References

External links
 Official website (archived) 

Spanish historical novels
2006 novels
Cathedrals in fiction
Novels set in Barcelona
Spanish Inquisition
Novels set in the 14th century